Fatt may refer to:
Arthur C. Fatt (1905–1999), American advertising executive
Jeff Fatt (born 1953), Australian musician and actor
Paul Fatt (1924–2014), British neuroscientist
Fitz and the Tantrums, an American band